Michael O'Carroll C.S.Sp., was an Irish Spiritan priest, writer, and teacher. Born Michael John Carroll, in Newcastle West, County Limerick in 1911, his father was a member of the Royal Irish Constabulary.

Educated in Blackrock College, Dublin,  the Holy Ghost Novitiate in Kimmage Manor, and at University College Dublin (BA in Philosophy and H. Dip. in Education), O'Carroll spent three years studying theology at the Dominican University of Fribourg in Switzerland, earning a Doctorate in Divinity. O'Carroll went back to teach French, Latin, English, History and Religion in Blackrock College.

A contributor for the Catholic Standard newspaper, O'Carroll wrote every editorial that appeared in the paper for 14 years and during the Second Vatican Council, he commented on the debates and decisions of the Council for the newspaper.

In 1995, O'Carroll was awarded an Honorary Doctorate in Theology by the Pontifical University of Maynooth.

Michael's older brother, Patrick F. O'Carroll, DD, also became a Holy Ghost priest, serving as Provincial of the order, and also worked as a professor in the United States.

O'Carroll was a noted mariologist.

He died on 12 January 2004 after a long illness and was buried in a community grave at Shanganagh Cemetery.

Publications
 "The Holy Ghost Father", Mission Outlook, (1973)
 Vassula of the Sacred Heart's Passion (1993)  
 Bearer of the Light – Vassula, Mediatrix of Divided Christians (1994) 
 John Paul II – A Dictionary of His Life and Teachings (1994) 
 A Priest in Changing Times (1998)

References

1911 births
2004 deaths
People from Newcastle West
Holy Ghost Fathers
Irish Spiritans
University of Fribourg alumni
Alumni of University College Dublin
People educated at Blackrock College
Irish expatriates in Switzerland
20th-century Irish Roman Catholic priests
Sportspeople from Limerick (city)